Gustav Althoff (1885  1948) was a German film producer. He was a leading independent producer during the Weimar and Nazi eras, establishing his own Althoff Studios in Berlin in 1939.

Originally a cinema-owner in Dortmund before expanding into film distribution, he moved to Berlin in 1920. He founded both his own Aco-Film company, and also co-founded Aafa-Film. He continued producing until the Nazi Party centralised all film production in the early 1940s.

Selected filmography

 Wallenstein (1925)
 The Old Ballroom (1925)
 Ash Wednesday (1925)
 The Lorelei (1927)
 Autumn on the Rhine (1928)
 Today I Was With Frieda (1928)
 The Lady from Argentina (1928)
 I Once Had a Beautiful Homeland (1928)
 Beware of Loose Women (1929)
 The Customs Judge (1929)
 The Lord of the Tax Office (1929)
 Distinguishing Features (1929)
 Yes, Yes, Women Are My Weakness (1929)
 Youthful Indiscretion (1929)
 Lux, King of Criminals (1929)
 The Youths (1929)
 The Gypsy Chief (1929)
 Crucified Girl (1929)
 Busy Girls (1930)
 The Man in the Dark (1930)
 The Rhineland Girl (1930)
 Ash Wednesday (1931)
 Without Meyer, No Celebration is Complete (1931)
 Duty is Duty (1931)
 Annemarie, the Bride of the Company (1932)
 Gretel Wins First Prize (1933)
 The Sandwich Girl (1933)
 The Vagabonds (1937)
 Monika (1938)
 Clarissa (1941)
 Alarm (1941)
 With the Eyes of a Woman (1942)

References

Bibliography
 Prawer, S.S. Between Two Worlds: The Jewish Presence in German and Austrian Film, 1910-1933. Berghahn Books, 2007.

External links

1885 births
1948 deaths
German film producers
People from Minden
Film people from North Rhine-Westphalia